Erringibba is a national park at Glenmorgan in the far west of the Darling Downs region of southern Queensland, Australia, 329 km west of Brisbane.
The park lies within the catchment area of the Condamine River and the Brigalow Belt South bioregion.

The landscape is flat and vegetated with open-forest dominated by brigalow and belah species common in the area.  The park's main aim is to preserve two endangered ecosystems which have been mostly cleared for agriculture. These include an shrubby open forest dominated by Acacia harpophylla and/or Casuarina cristata on Cainozoic clay plains and open forest to woodland of Eucalyptus populnea with Acacia harpophylla and/or Casuarina cristata on Cainozoic clay plains.

A total of four rare of threatened species have been identified in Erringibba.

The average elevation of the terrain is 294 meters.

See also

 Protected areas of Queensland

References

External links
  Map of Queensland National Parks

National parks of Queensland
Protected areas established in 1999
Darling Downs
1999 establishments in Australia